Faaiz Anwar is an Indian poet and lyricist who has written songs for popular movies including Dil Hai Ke Manta Nahin, Saajan, Tum Bin, Jab We Met, Dabangg, and Rowdy Rathore.

Career

Anwar entered the Hindi music industry by chance. In 1989, on a sightseeing visit to Bombay, he happened to meet Roop Kumar Rathod. Impressed by his Shayri, Roop Kumar Rathore introduced him to Mahesh Bhatt. And, Mahesh Bhatt was so impressed by his Shayari that he asked to join the Film Industry and even promised to give the break. 
And Mahesh Bhatt kept his promise. Mahesh Bhatt was working on a subject and had the music ready for a song but wanted Shayri with a touch of sensibility and human feel. He tried many established lyricists but they could not satiate Mahesh Bhatt's demanding soul. He asked Faaiz Anwaar to write lyrics. In 40 min. what Faaiz Anwaar wrote, went to become musical milestone of Music Industry. This was the title song "Dil Hai Ke Manta Nahin" which stayed on the top of the most popular Radio Programme Cibaca Geetmala for almost two years. Soon, followed musical hit film of the year "Imtihaan" and Saajan” which consolidated his place in the Film Industry. He was nominated for Best Lyricist for his debut song "Dil Hai Ke Maanta Nahi" (Film: Dil Hai Ke Maanta Nahin), "Is Tarah Aashiqui Ka Asar... (Film: Imtehan), and "Tere Mast Mast Do Nain" (Film: Dabangg) in Filmfare awards, Zee awards.

Filmography
 Dil Hai Ke Manta Nahin
 Saajan 
 Jaanam
 Aaja Meri Jaan (1993)
 Kasam Teri Kasam (1993)
 Tum Karo Vaada (1993)
 Do Dilon Ka Sangam (1993)
 Shabnam
 Tehquiqat
 Karan (1994)
 Kanoon (1994)
 Vijaypath
 Naaraaz
 Imtihaan
 Hum Hain Bemisaal
 The Gambler
 The Don
 Haqeeqat
 Surakshaa
 Hulchul
 Ram Aur Shyam (1996)
 Dil Kitna Nadan Hai (1997)
 Iski Topi Uske Sarr
 Aakrosh
 Humse Badhkar Kaun
 Bade Dilwala (1999)
 Hello Brother
 Papa The Great (2000)
 Baaghi
 Tum Bin
 Yeh Zindagi Ka Safar (2001)
 Pyaasa
 Gunaah
 Maine Dil Tujhko Diya
 Khel – No Ordinary Game
 Khwahish
 Koi Mere Dil Mein
 Chand Bujh Gaya
 Saathi
 Zindagi Tere Naam
 Jab We Met
 Dabangg
 Rowdy Rathore
 Yeh Jo Mohabbat Hai
 Anuradha
 Munde Kamaal De
 Love Ke Funday
 Veerey Ki Wedding
 Ek Haseena Thi Ek Deewana Tha

Albums

Accolades

References

http://www.starblockbuster.com/i-know-when-my-song-is-a-hit-faaiz-anwar/

1965 births
Indian lyricists
Screenwriters from Uttar Pradesh
Living people